Dhammananda may refer to:

 K. Sri Dhammananda (1919–2006), Sri Lankan Buddhist monk and scholar
 Dhammananda Bhikkhuni (born 1944), Thai female monk